Surville can refer to:

People

 Jean-François-Marie de Surville (1717-1770), a French trader and navigator

Places

 Surville, Calvados, a commune in the Calvados département, France 
 Surville, Eure, a commune in the Eure département, France  
Surville, Manche, a commune in the Manche département, France 
 a northern quarter of the city of Montereau-Fault-Yonne, France 
The Surville Cliffs, the northernmost point of the North Island of New Zealand